Alexander Dinelaris Jr. is a screenwriter. He is one of four who won the Academy Award for Best Original Screenplay for the 2014 film Birdman at the 87th Academy Awards in 2015. Dinelaris also wrote the book for the Broadway musical On Your Feet about the life and career of Gloria Estefan. For this, he was nominated for the Outer Critics Circle Award for Outstanding Book of a Musical. In 2019, he formed his New York-based production company Lexicon and announced that its first feature film will be an adaptation of the Broadway musical Jekyll & Hyde, which Dinelaris will adapt into a screenplay and produce. That same year, he filmed the short film In This, Our Time, which he wrote and directed.
The first workshop of Boman Irani's Spiral Bound was conducted by Alexander Dinelaris Jr

References

External links
 

Living people
Best Original Screenplay Academy Award winners
American male screenwriters
Place of birth missing (living people)
Best Screenplay AACTA International Award winners
1968 births